Adolf Pietarinpoika Taimi (21 September 1881 – 1 November 1955)  was a Finnish-Soviet Bolshevik and a member of the People's Delegation during the Finnish Civil War. After the civil war Taimi fled to Soviet Russia where he was one of the founding members of the Communist Party of Finland.

Early life

Adolf Taimi was born and raised in Saint Petersburg. He joined the Russian Social Democratic Labour Party in 1902.

As member of the parties Bolsheviks wing Taimi was arrested first time in 1906. He was deported to the City of Nikolski. Later he fled back to Saint Petersburg where he met the contact person Nadezhda Krupskaya who send Taimi to Helsinki because of his linguistic skills.

In Helsinki, Taimi worked in a Russian Army's shipyard and was active in the Bolshevik Military Committee. He had also contact with Finnish Social Democrat radical circle.

In 1912 Taimi was arrested again and he was exiled to Siberia for four years. During his exile Taimi studied Marxist literature. After the February Revolution Taimi returned to Saint Petersburg where the Bolsheviks sent him to Helsinki on April 1917.

In Finland, Taimi had a mission to be in contact with Bolshevik soldiers and Finnish Social Democrats. He took part in the party conference of the Finnish Social Democratic Party in June and November.

In his speeches, Taimi urged Finns for revolution. In December, he urged the Labour Guards to operate independently if necessary. In January Taimi was elected as "additional member" of the party's committee. He worked all the time in close cooperation with the Bolshevik-led Helsinki Council.

During the Civil War Taimi was the delegate for internal affairs of the People's Delegation in which he had connections to the Red Guards. When the delegate for Internal Affairs, Supreme Commander of the Red Guard Eero Haapalainen was deposed because of heavy drinking his replacement was Taimi, Eino Rahja and Evert Eloranta.

After the end of the civil war, Taimi fled to Soviet Russia where he was one of the founding members of the Finnish Communist Party in 1918.

Taimi was elected to the member of Central Committee of the Communist Party in 1924. In 1923 he allied with Otto Wille Kuusinen and Kullervo Manner against Eino Rahjaa who was accused of being unsuitable in the parties leadership.

Taimi worked in the underground organizations of the Finnish Communist Party in Finland in 1922–1923 and 1927–1928. Taimi was also active in the Comintern. He was arrested in Finland in 1928 and received a long prison sentence.

Taimi was released after the Winter War along with Toivo Antikainen. Both were deported back to the Soviet Union. Taimi settled in the Karelo-Finnish Soviet Socialist Republic. He was intercepted by prison time, disputes with other Finnish Communists and he was not able to rise in the higher ranks of the Finnish Communist Party. Taimi published his memoirs in 1954 in Finnish.

References

1881 births
1955 deaths
Politicians from Saint Petersburg
People from Sankt-Peterburgsky Uyezd
Old Bolsheviks
Communist Party of Finland politicians
Finnish People's Delegation members
Finnish emigrants to the Soviet Union
Finnish exiles
First convocation members of the Soviet of Nationalities
Second convocation members of the Soviet of Nationalities
Third convocation members of the Soviet of Nationalities
Fourth convocation members of the Soviet of Nationalities
Members of the Supreme Soviet of the Karelo-Finnish Soviet Socialist Republic
Recipients of the Order of Lenin